MARPAT (short for Marine pattern) is a multi-scale camouflage pattern in use with the United States Marine Corps, designed in 2001 and introduced from late 2002 to early 2005 with the Marine Corps Combat Utility Uniform (MCCUU), which replaced the Camouflage Utility Uniform. Its design and concept are based on the Canadian CADPAT pattern. The pattern is formed of small rectangular pixels of color. In theory, it is a far more effective camouflage than standard uniform patterns because it mimics the dappled textures and rough boundaries found in natural settings. It is also known as the "digital pattern" or "digi-cammies" because of its micropattern (pixels) rather than the old macropattern (big blobs).

The United States government has patented MARPAT, including specifics of its manufacture. By regulation, the pattern and items incorporating it, such as the MCCUU and ILBE backpack, are to be supplied by authorized manufacturers only and are not for general commercial sale, although imitations are available such as "Digital Woodland Camo" or "Digital Desert Camo".

MARPAT was also chosen because it distinctively identifies its wearers as Marines to their adversaries, while simultaneously helping its wearers remain concealed. This was demonstrated by a Marine spokesman at the launch of MARPAT, who stated: "We want to be instantly recognized as a force to be reckoned with. We want them to see us coming a mile away in our new uniforms." As such, the U.S. Marine Corps restricts use of the camouflage, preventing its use in most other divisions of the United States military with the exception of some elements of the U.S. Navy.

Development

MARPAT was designed by Timothy O'Neill, Anabela Dugas, Kenneth G. Henley, John Joseph Heisterman, Jr., Luisa DeMorais Santos, Gabriel R. Patricio, and Deirdre E. Townes.

The concept of using miniature swatches of color as opposed to large splotches is not new.  In World War II, German troops used various patterns similar to the current German Flecktarn, which involved similar small dabs of color on a uniform to provide camouflage.

The Canadian Forces originally developed the pattern called CADPAT, on which MARPAT was based. Timothy O'Neill's USMC design team in charge of this process, initially with the assistance of Kenneth G. Henley and then John Joseph Heisterman, Jr. (both active duty U.S. Marine Scout Snipers), went through over 150 different camo patterns before selecting three samples that met their initial objectives. These were two versions of tigerstripe and an older design of Rhodesian Brushstroke. The influence of tigerstripe can still be seen in the final MARPAT. These three samples were then reconstructed using new shapes and unique color blends that would allow a more effective uniform in a great range of environments.

The new patterns were then field tested in different environments, day and night, with night vision and various optics. MARPAT did exceptionally well in their wet uniform test when viewed with night vision while illuminated with IR, where normally patterns appear as a solid. The MARPAT patent lists U.S. Army research into fractal pattern camouflage as the basis for MARPAT.

The MARPAT pattern was chosen in a run-off against seven other patterns at the USMC Scout Sniper Instructor School.

Preliminary development of MARPAT began in April 2000, with field testing of the pattern and the MCCUU beginning in 2001. The patent for the MARPAT pattern was filed on 19 June 2001, whereas the patent for the MCCUU uniform was filed on 7 November 2001. Early prototypes of the MARPAT desert pattern from 2001 featured grey, whereas the finished product did not.

In 2001, Marine Forces Pacific Lt. Gen. Frank Libutti and Sgt. Maj. Stephen Mellinger were the first Marines to publicly wear the uniform before the uniform made its official debut at Camp Lejeune, North Carolina on 17 January 2002. In February 2003, MARPAT-patterned helmet covers began to be produced. The replacement of the BDU and DCU by the MCCUU was completed on 1 October 2004, a year ahead of the original requirement date set in 2001 of 1 October 2005.
	 
The MARPAT uniform was officially fielded as standard issue to the officer candidates of OCC-181 at MCB Quantico and the recruits of 3rd BN Mike Company at MCRD San Diego in late 2002;It continues to be the USMC's standard issue uniform pattern to date.
 
In all, the MARPAT development process from concept to completion took 18 months, the fastest time for a U.S. military-developed camouflage pattern to be produced.

Design and colors
Different ratios and variations of colors were tested before final candidate patterns were actually printed to textile for field trials. A modified version of Vietnam War–era tiger stripe also made it to final trials but was eliminated due to MARPAT being superior in all environments. The purpose of the digitized pattern is to create visual "noise" and prevent the eye from identifying any visual templates. Thus, the pattern is intended to not register as any particular shape or pattern that could be distinguished.

There were initially three MARPAT patterns tested: Woodland, Desert, and Urban. While keeping the rights for Urban, only the Woodland and Desert patterns were adopted by the Marine Corps for general issue, replacing the U.S. Woodland pattern and the U.S. Three-Color Desert pattern. Webbing and equipment worn with MARPAT Woodland and MARPAT Desert is produced in Coyote Brown, a mid-tone color common to both the woodland and desert patterns. Although a digital snow pattern has also been adopted on cold-weather training over-garments, this uses a different pattern from the Canadian company Hyperstealth.

Authentic MARPAT material is distinguishable by a miniature "Eagle, Globe, and Anchor" emblem incorporated into the pattern above the letters "USMC", in both the woodland and desert patterns.

Similar designs

MARPAT is aesthetically similar to Canadian Forces CADPAT, which was first developed in the 1990s.

The United States Army used the same shapes in designing its Universal Camouflage Pattern, which uses a much paler three-color scheme of sage green, grey and sand for use on the Army Combat Uniform. After major questions about its effectiveness arose, the Army adopted the "Scorpion W2" Operational Camouflage Pattern in 2015, which was fully phased in by 2019.

The United States Air Force designed its own Airman Battle Uniform (ABU) using a standard tiger stripe pattern and slight variation on the color scheme of ACU. It was also phased out by the OCP uniform by 2021.

The United States Navy announced approval for a digital "BDU-style" work uniform in late 2008. The Navy Working Uniform (NWU) was chosen by surveyed sailors for consistency and longer life, while the blue-grey-black Type I pattern was designed for aesthetic purposes rather than camouflage to disguise them at sea. In January 2010, the Navy began considering new Navy Working Uniform patterns modified from MARPAT, with a Type II desert pattern and Type III woodland pattern. The Woodland pattern was actually an earlier coloration of the MARPAT scheme, not adopted following USMC trials. These patterns are overall darker than their respective MARPAT equivalents, modified with different color shades. They were introduced because the blue and grey Type I pattern was not meant for a tactical environment (the Battle Dress Uniform in M81 woodland and Desert Camouflage Uniform were still used for this purpose until the Type II and III patterns were introduced). Backlash from Marines, including an objection from former Commandant Conway, led to restrictions when NAVADMIN 374/09 was released: Type II pattern is restricted to Naval Special Warfare personnel while deployed, while the NWU Type III is the standard shore working uniform for all Naval personnel effective 1 October 2019. The blue and grey Type I uniform was discontinued .

ARMPAT, an Armenian version of the MARPAT pattern, is currently used by the Armenian Armed Forces, and the Artsakh Defense Army. It has the same design as the MARPAT, but with different color sets.

Users

 : 
 : Used by RBDF soldiers.
 
 : Used by BOPE in woodland operations.
 : MARPAT clones (Temperate/woodland versions) used by Chadian troops.
 :
 : Woodland clones used by Cypriot special forces.
 : Was the standard issue camouflage of the Georgian military from 2007 to 2014 with temperate and desert versions used, used on US-made uniforms, when it was replaced by MultiCam. Still in limited use by Georgian Police and paramilitaries as of 2017.
 : Used by Garud Commando Force and Para SF in jungle operations.
 : Temperate MARPAT clones used by IRGC Sepah forces.
 : Woodland MARPAT worn by Commando Regiment and desert MARPAT worn by Airborne Regiment.
 : Clones of MARPAT used by the 084th Special Task Battalion.
 : Used by some PDF units as of 2022.
 : Used by Special Task Unit "Tiger". Used by officers of the Special Support Unit.
 : MARPAT clone used by Royal Saint Lucia Police Force units.
 : Clones of the desert MARPAT seen with Saudi troops. Used by Al-Afwaj Regiment, Ministry of Interior (Saudi Arabia).

Non-state actors
  People's Protection Units

Gallery

References

Bibliography

Further reading

External links

 Photos of USMC-issued MARPAT
 Notes from the original designer of MARPAT

2001 in military history
United States military uniforms
Camouflage patterns
Military camouflage
Products introduced in 2001
United States Marine Corps equipment
Military equipment introduced in the 2000s